The Zodiac Killer is the pseudonym of an unidentified serial killer who operated in Northern California in the late 1960s. The case has been described as the most famous unsolved murder case in American history. It became a fixture of popular culture and inspired amateur detectives to attempt to solve it.

The Zodiac murdered five known victims in the San Francisco Bay Area between December 1968 and October 1969, operating in rural, urban and suburban settings. He targeted young couples and a lone male cab driver. His known attacks took place in Benicia, Vallejo, unincorporated Napa County, and the city of San Francisco proper. Two of his wounded victims survived. The Zodiac claimed to have murdered 37 victims. He has been linked to several other cold cases, some in Southern California or outside the state.

The Zodiac coined this name in a series of taunting letters and cards that he mailed to regional newspapers, in which he threatened killing sprees and bombings if they were not printed. Some of the letters included cryptograms, or ciphers, in which the killer claimed that he was collecting his victims as slaves for the afterlife. Of the four ciphers he produced, two remain unsolved, and one was cracked only in 2020. While many theories regarding the identity of the killer have been suggested, the only suspect authorities ever publicly named was Arthur Leigh Allen, a former elementary school teacher and convicted sex offender who died in 1992.

Although the Zodiac ceased written communications around 1974, the unusual nature of the case led to international interest that has been sustained throughout the years. The San Francisco Police Department marked the case "inactive" in April 2004, but re-opened it at some point prior to March 2007. The case also remains open in the city of Vallejo, as well as in Napa and Solano counties. The California Department of Justice has maintained an open case file on the Zodiac murders since 1969.

Murders and correspondence

Confirmed murders 
Although the Zodiac claimed in letters to newspapers to have committed 37 murders, investigators agree on  seven confirmed assault victims, five of whom died and two survived. They are:
 David Arthur Faraday, 17, and Betty Lou Jensen, 16, were shot and killed on December 20, 1968, on Lake Herman Road, within the city limits of Benicia.
 Michael Renault Mageau, 19, and Darlene Elizabeth Ferrin, 22, were shot on July 4, 1969, in the parking lot of Blue Rock Springs Park in Vallejo. Mageau survived the attack; Ferrin was pronounced dead on arrival at Kaiser Foundation Hospital.
 Bryan Calvin Hartnell, 20, and Cecelia Ann Shepard, 22, were stabbed on September 27, 1969, at Lake Berryessa in Napa County. Hartnell survived, but Shepard died as a result of her injuries a couple days later on September 29.
 Paul Lee Stine, 29, was shot and killed on October 11, 1969, in the Presidio Heights neighborhood of San Francisco.

Lake Herman Road murders

The first murders widely attributed to the Zodiac Killer were the shootings of high school students Betty Lou Jensen and David Arthur Faraday on December 20, 1968 on Lake Herman Road, just inside the city limits of Benicia. The couple were on their first date and planned to attend a Christmas concert at Hogan High School, about three blocks from Jensen's home. They visited a friend before stopping at a local restaurant and driving out on Lake Herman Road, a popular area for young couples. At about 10:15 p.m., Faraday parked his mother's Rambler in a gravel turnout, which was a well-known lovers' lane. Shortly after 11:00 p.m., their bodies were found by Stella Borges, who lived nearby. The Solano County Sheriff's Department investigated the crime but no leads developed.

Using available forensic data, Robert Graysmith later speculated in his 1976 account that another car pulled into the turnout just prior to 11:00 p.m. and parked beside the couple. The killer may have exited the second car and walked toward the Rambler, possibly ordering the couple out of it. It appeared that Jensen had exited the car first, but when Faraday was halfway out, the killer shot him in the head. The killer shot Jensen five times in the back as she fled; her body was found 28 feet from the car. The killer drove off after this.

Blue Rock Springs murder
Just before midnight on July 4, 1969, Darlene Ferrin and Michael Mageau drove into the Blue Rock Springs Park in Vallejo and parked. While the couple sat in Ferrin's car, a second car drove into the lot and parked alongside them but almost immediately drove away. Returning about 10 minutes later, this second car parked behind them. The driver of the second car exited and approached the passenger side door of Ferrin's car, carrying a flashlight and a 9 mm Luger. The killer directed the flashlight into Mageau's and Ferrin's eyes before shooting at them, firing five times. Both victims were hit, and several bullets passed through Mageau and into Ferrin. The killer walked away from the car but returned and shot each victim twice more before driving off.

On July 5, 1969, at 12:40 a.m., a man phoned the Vallejo Police Department to report and claim responsibility for the attack. The caller also took credit for the murders of Jensen and Faraday six and a half months earlier. Ferrin was pronounced dead at the hospital. Mageau survived the attack despite being shot in the face, neck and chest. Mageau described his attacker as a 26-to-30-year-old,  or possibly even more,  white male with short, light brown curly hair.

First letters from the Zodiac

On August 1, 1969, three letters purportedly prepared by the killer were received at the Vallejo Times Herald, the San Francisco Chronicle, and The San Francisco Examiner. The nearly identical letters, subsequently described by a psychiatrist to have been written by "someone you would expect to be brooding and isolated", took credit for the shootings at Lake Herman Road and Blue Rock Springs. Each letter also included one-third of a 408-symbol cryptogram which the killer claimed contained his identity. The killer demanded they be printed on each paper's front page or he would "cruse around all weekend killing lone people in the night then move on to kill again, until I end up with a dozen people over the weekend".

The Chronicle published its third of the cryptogram on page four of the next day's edition. An article printed alongside the code quoted Vallejo Police Chief Jack E. Stiltz as saying "We're not satisfied that the letter was written by the murderer" and requested the writer send a second letter with more facts to prove his identity. The threatened murders did not happen, and all three parts of the cryptogram were eventually published.

On August 7, 1969, The San Francisco Examiner received a letter with the salutation, "Dear Editor This is the Zodiac speaking." This was the first time the killer had used this name for identification. The letter was a response to Chief Stiltz's request for more details that would prove he had killed Faraday, Jensen and Ferrin. In it, the Zodiac included details about the murders that had not yet been released to the public. He also said that when the police cracked his code "they will have me".

Author Søren Roest Korsgaard explains that the "episode" paragraph in this letter referenced the Alfred Hitchcock Presents episode "Museum Piece"/ The attachment of a light to a gun was a plot element which Zodiac adopted. The episode dialog also contains the phrase "the most dangerous game". Zodiac was both referring to and acting out Hitchcock story elements.

On August 8, 1969, Donald and Bettye Harden of Salinas, California cracked the 408-symbol cryptogram. It contained a misspelled message in which the killer seemed to reference "The Most Dangerous Game". The author also said that he was collecting slaves for his afterlife. No name appears in this decoded text. The killer said that he would not give away his identity because it would slow down or stop his slave collection.

Lake Berryessa murder

On September 27, 1969, Pacific Union College students Bryan Hartnell and Cecelia Shepard were picnicking at Lake Berryessa on a small island connected by a sand spit to Twin Oak Ridge. He approached them with a gun, which Hartnell believed to be a .45. The hooded man claimed to be an escaped convict from a jail with a two-word name, in either Colorado or Montana (a police officer later inferred that the man had been referring to a jail in Deer Lodge, Montana), where he had killed a guard and subsequently stolen a car. He said that he needed their car and money to travel to Mexico because the stolen vehicle was "too hot".

The killer had brought precut lengths of plastic clothesline and told Shepard to tie up Hartnell before he tied her up. The killer checked, and tightened Hartnell's bonds after discovering that Shepard had bound Hartnell's hands loosely. Hartnell initially believed this event to be a bizarre robbery, but the man drew a knife and stabbed them both repeatedly. Hartnell suffered six and Shepard ten wounds in the process. The killer hiked  up to Knoxville Road, drew the cross-circle symbol on Hartnell's car door with a black felt-tip pen, and wrote beneath it: 

Vallejo
12-20-68
7-4-69
Sept 27–69–6:30
by knife

At 7:40 p.m., the killer called the Napa County Sheriff's office from a pay telephone to report this latest crime. The caller first stated to the operator that he wished to "report a murder – no, a double murder," before saying that he had committed the crime. KVON radio reporter Pat Stanley found the phone, still off the hook, a few minutes later at the Napa Car Wash on Main Street in Napa. Detectives lifted a still-wet palm print from the telephone but were never able to match it to any suspect.

After hearing the victims' screams for help, a man and his son fishing in a nearby cove discovered the couple and got help by contacting park rangers. Napa County Sheriff's deputies Dave Collins and Ray Land were the first law enforcement officers to arrive at the crime scene. Shepard was conscious when Collins arrived, and provided him with a detailed description of the attacker. Hartnell and Shepard were taken to Queen of the Valley Hospital in Napa by ambulance. Shepard lapsed into a coma during transport, never regained consciousness, and died two days later. Hartnell survived to recount his tale to the press. Napa County detective Ken Narlow, who was assigned to the case from the outset, worked on solving the crime until his retirement from the department in 1987.

Presidio Heights murder

Two weeks later, on October 11, 1969, a white male passenger entered the cab driven by Paul Stine at the intersection of Mason and Geary Streets (one block west from Union Square) in San Francisco, requesting to be driven to Washington and Maple streets in Presidio Heights. For reasons unknown, Stine drove one block past Maple to Cherry Street. The passenger shot Stine once in the head with a 9 mm handgun, took the driver's wallet and car keys, and tore away a section of his bloodstained shirt tail. Three teenagers across the street at 9:55 p.m. saw the incident, and phoned the police while the crime was in progress. They observed a man wiping the cab down before walking away toward the Presidio, one block to the north.
Two blocks from the crime scene, patrol officers Don Fouke and Eric Zelms, responding to the call, observed a white man walking along the sidewalk east on Jackson Street and stepping onto a stairway leading up to the front yard of one of the homes on the north side of the street; the encounter lasted only five to ten seconds.

However, the police radio dispatcher had alerted officers to look out for a black suspect, so Fouke and Zelms drove past the perpetrator without stopping; the mixup in descriptions remains unexplained. A search ensued, but no suspects were found. This was the last officially confirmed murder by the Zodiac Killer.

The Stine murder was initially believed to be a routine robbery that had escalated into homicidal violence. However, on October 13, the San Francisco Chronicle received a new letter from Zodiac that claimed credit for the killing and contained a torn section of Stine's bloody shirt to "prove this" fact. The three teen witnesses worked with a police artist to prepare a composite sketch of Stine's killer; a few days later, this police artist returned, working with the witnesses to prepare a second composite sketch. Detectives Bill Armstrong and Dave Toschi were assigned to the case. The San Francisco Police Department investigated an estimated 2,500 suspects over a period of years.

1969 mailings

On October 14, 1969, the Chronicle received another letter from the Zodiac, this time containing a swatch of Paul Stine's shirt tail as proof he was the killer; it also included a threat about killing schoolchildren on a school bus. To do this, Zodiac wrote, "just shoot out the front tire & then pick off the kiddies as they come bouncing out". At 2:00 p.m. on October 20, 1969, someone claiming to be the Zodiac called the Oakland Police Department (OPD), demanding that one of two prominent lawyers, F. Lee Bailey or Melvin Belli, appear on A.M. San Francisco, a talk show on KGO-TV hosted by Jim Dunbar. Bailey was not available, but Belli did appear on the show. Dunbar appealed to the viewers to keep the lines open. Someone claiming to be the Zodiac called several times, and Belli asked the caller for a less ominous name and the caller picked "Sam". The caller said he would not reveal his true identity as he was afraid of being sent to the gas chamber (then California's capital punishment method). Belli arranged a rendezvous to meet the caller outside a shop on Mission Street in Daly City, but no one arrived. The call was later traced back to a patient in a mental institution, and investigators concluded that the man was not the Zodiac.

On November 8, 1969, the Zodiac mailed a card with another cryptogram consisting of 340 characters. This cipher, dubbed "Z-340", remained unsolved for over 51 years. On December 5, 2020, it was deciphered by an international team of private citizens, including American software engineer David Oranchak, Australian mathematician Sam Blake and Belgian programmer . In the decrypted message, the Zodiac denied being the "Sam" who spoke on A.M. San Francisco, explaining that he was not afraid of the gas chamber "because it will send me to paradice [sic] all the sooner". The team submitted their findings to the Federal Bureau of Investigation, which verified the discovery. The FBI stated that the decoded message gave no further clues to the identity of Zodiac.

On November 9, 1969, the Zodiac mailed a seven-page letter stating that two policemen stopped and actually spoke with him three minutes after he shot Stine. Excerpts from the letter were published in the Chronicle on November 12, including the Zodiac's claim; that same day, Officer Don Fouke wrote a memo explaining what had happened on the night of Stine's murder. On December 20, 1969, exactly one year after the murders of David Faraday and Betty Lou Jensen, the Zodiac mailed a letter to Belli that included another swatch of Stine's shirt; the Zodiac said that he wanted Belli to help him.

Suspected victims
There is no consensus on the number of victims that the Zodiac had or the length of his criminal spree. In the 1986 non-fiction book Zodiac, author Robert Graysmith published a list attributing 49 victims to the Zodiac. This list included some crimes which have either been entirely solved or whose links to the Zodiac have been completely discredited by investigators. Various other authors speculated at the time of the killings that several other high-profile murders and attacks may have been the work of the Zodiac, but none have been confirmed:
 Local historian Kristi Hawthorne suggests that the Zodiac may have murdered 29-year-old cab driver Raymond “Ray” Davis in Oceanside, California. On April 9, 1962, the day before the murder, an individual believed to be the culprit had phoned the Oceanside Police Department and told them "I am going to pull something here in Oceanside and you'll never be able to figure it out". A few days after the murder, the police received another call from who is presumed to be the same individual, in which he told police details of the murder and said he would kill a bus driver next. Following Hawthorne's research Oceanside police announced that they were looking into possible connections between the murder and the Zodiac.
 Bill Baker of the Santa Barbara County Sheriff's Office postulated that the 1963 murders of a young couple in northern Santa Barbara County might have been the work of the Zodiac Killer. On June 4, 1963, high school senior 18-year-old Robert George Domingos and his fiancée 17-year-old Linda Faye Edwards were shot dead on a beach near Lompoc, having skipped school that day for Senior Ditch Day. Police believed that the assailant attempted to bind the victims, but when they freed themselves and attempted to flee, the killer shot them repeatedly in the back and chest with a .22-caliber weapon. The killer then placed their bodies in a small shack and then tried, unsuccessfully, to burn the structure to the ground.
 On February 5, 1964, Johnny Ray Swindle, 19, and Joyce Ann Swindle, 19, a newlywed couple from Alabama, were gunned down while walking along Ocean Beach in San Diego, California while on their honeymoon. Their killer, who was on a nearby cliff with a .22-caliber rifle, shot them from a distance. Johnny lingered on for hours, despite bullet wounds to his back, left thigh, left ear and temple. Joyce died almost instantly after she was shot in the back, left arm and head. The suspect then took Johnny's wallet when he succumbed to his wounds and left the crime scene. Police speculated that the two were victims of a “thrill killer" and Rita Swindle, Johnny's sister, has theorised that the murders might have been the earliest slayings of the Zodiac.
 Cheri Jo Bates, 18, was stabbed to death and nearly decapitated on October 30, 1966, at Riverside City College in Riverside. Bates's possible connection to the Zodiac only appeared four years after her murder when San Francisco Chronicle reporter Paul Avery received a tip regarding similarities between the Zodiac killings and the circumstances surrounding Bates's death.
 On June 8, 1967, Enedine Molina Martinez, 35, and Fermin Rodriguez, 36, were attacked and murdered at around 10 p.m. on Vallecitos Road in Alameda County, California while they were relaxing in their vehicle. A stranger approached them and told them to get out of the car. Fermin was shot as he exited the car and the killer abducted Enedine leaving Rodriguez dead beside Molina’s car. The killer then stopped by the entrance of Sunol Regional Wilderness Preserve where Enedine tried to escape. The abductor then shot her twice in the back killing her instantly before driving off. Shortly afterward, a nearby resident called the Santa Rita police substation to report two gunshots. Officers found Enedine's lifeless body at 11 p.m. Authorities then discovered her car parked on Vallecitos Road where they found the body of Fermin. He had been shot twice from the front; once in the chest and once in the shoulder. The weapon was a .22-caliber. Rape and robbery was ruled out as a motive. The murders occurred close to Pleasanton, California, where the Zodiac mailed a letter in March 1971 to the Los Angeles Times Newspaper.
 On February 21, 1970, John Franklin Hood, 24, who had served decorated time in Vietnam in the 64th Armoured Division and his fiancée Sandra Garcia, 20, who worked in the California Department of Motor Vehicles and was a Bishop High School graduate and Santa Barbara City College student, visited East Beach in Santa Barbara, California. The couple were discovered the following day lying face down on their blanket. Hood suffered eleven knife wounds, the majority inflicted to his face and back, with Garcia receiving the brunt of the vicious attack, leaving her almost unrecognisable. The bone-handled 4" fish knife used in their murder was retrieved from beneath the blanket, partially buried in the sand. There appeared to be no sexual interference and robbery was ruled out. The double murder bore many similarities to the previous murders of Domingos and Edwards, 30 miles miles west of the attack and seven years earlier, as well as the Lake Berryessa attack on Hartnell and Shepard. 
 Kathleen Johns, 22, was allegedly abducted on March 22, 1970 on Highway 132 near I-580, in an area west of Modesto. Johns escaped from the car of a man who drove her and her infant daughter around the area between Stockton and Patterson for approximately 1 hours.
 On June 19, 1970, 25-year-old police sergeant Richard Phillip “Rich” Radetich was gunned down by three shots from a .38-caliber revolver at point blank range through the driver side window of his vehicle, while in the process of serving a parking ticket on the 600 block of Waller Street in the Haight Ashbury district of San Francisco, California. Police investigated a possible link to the Zodiac, who alluded to his responsibility for the crime in taunting notes to authorities; however, no direct evidence has ever been established between Radetich's death and the Zodiac. 
 Donna Ann Lass, 25, was last seen September 6, 1970 in Stateline, Nevada. A postcard bearing an advertisement for Forest Pines condominiums (near Incline Village at Lake Tahoe) pasted on the back was received at the Chronicle on March 22, 1971. No evidence has been uncovered to connect Lass's disappearance with the Zodiac Killer.

Cheri Jo Bates

On October 30, 1966, an 18-year-old student at Riverside City College, Cheri Jo Bates, spent the evening at the campus library annex until it closed at 9:00 p.m. Neighbors reported hearing a scream around 10:30 p.m. Bates was found dead the next morning, a short distance from the library, between two abandoned houses slated to be demolished for campus renovations. The wires in her Volkswagen's distributor cap had been pulled out. She was brutally beaten and stabbed to death. A man's Timex watch with a torn wristband was found nearby. The watch had stopped at 12:24, but police believe that the attack had occurred much earlier.

A month later, on November 29, 1966, nearly identical typewritten letters were mailed to the Riverside police and the Riverside Press-Enterprise, titled "The Confession". The author claimed responsibility for the Bates murder, providing details of the crime that were not released to the public. The author warned that Bates "is not the first and she will not be the last". In December 1966, a poem was discovered carved into the bottom side of a desktop in the Riverside City College library. Titled "Sick of living/unwilling to die", the poem's language and handwriting resembled that of the Zodiac's letters. It was signed with what were assumed to be the initials rh. During the 1970 investigation, Sherwood Morrill, California's top "questioned documents" examiner, expressed his opinion that the poem was written by the Zodiac.

On April 30, 1967, exactly six months after the Bates murder, Bates' father Joseph, the Press-Enterprise, and the Riverside police all received nearly identical letters. In handwritten scrawl, the Press-Enterprise and police copies read "Bates had to die there will be more," with a small scribble at the bottom that resembled the letter Z. Joseph Bates' copy read "She had to die there will be more," this time without the Z signature. In August 2021, the Riverside Police Department's Homicide Cold Case Unit announced that the author of the handwritten letters anonymously contacted investigators in 2016 and was identified via DNA analysis in 2020. He admitted the correspondence was a distasteful hoax and apologized, explaining that he had been a troubled teenager and wrote the letters as a means of seeking attention. Investigators confirmed that the author was not the Zodiac.

On March 13, 1971, five months after Avery's article linking the Zodiac to the Riverside murder, the Zodiac mailed a letter to the Los Angeles Times. In the letter he credited the police, instead of Avery, for discovering his "Riverside activity, but they are only finding the easy ones, there are a hell of a lot more down there". The connection between Cheri Jo Bates, Riverside and the Zodiac remains uncertain. Paul Avery and the Riverside Police Department maintain that the Bates homicide was not committed by the Zodiac, but did concede that some of the Bates letters may have been his work to claim credit falsely.

Kathleen Johns
On the night of March 22, 1970, Kathleen Johns was driving from San Bernardino to Petaluma to visit her mother. She was seven months pregnant and had her 10-month-old daughter beside her. While heading west on Highway 132 near Modesto, a car behind her began honking its horn and flashing its headlights. She pulled off the road and stopped. The man in the car parked behind her, approached her car, stated that he observed that her right rear wheel was wobbling, and offered to tighten the lug nuts. After finishing his work, the man drove off; yet when Johns pulled forward to re-enter the highway the wheel almost immediately came off the car. The man returned, offering to drive her to the nearest gas station for help. She and her daughter climbed into his car.

During the ride, the car passed several service stations, but the man did not stop. For about 90 minutes, he drove back and forth around the back roads near Tracy. When Johns asked why he was not stopping, he would change the subject. When the driver finally stopped at an intersection, Johns jumped out with her daughter and hid in a field. The driver searched for her using a flashlight, telling her that he would not hurt her, before eventually giving up. Unable to find her, he got back into the car and drove off. Johns hitched a ride to the police station in Patterson.

When Johns gave her statement to the sergeant on duty, she noticed the police composite sketch of Paul Stine's killer and recognized him as the man who had abducted her and her child. Fearing that he might return to kill them all, the sergeant had Johns wait in the dark at nearby Mil's Restaurant. When her car was found, it had been gutted and torched.

Most accounts say that the man threatened to kill Johns and her daughter while driving them around, but at least one police report disputes that. Johns' account to Paul Avery of the Chronicle indicates that her abductor left his car and searched for her in the dark with a flashlight; however, in one report she made to the police, she stated that he did not leave the vehicle.

Donna Lass

On March 22, 1971, a postcard to the Chronicle, addressed to "Paul Averly"  and believed to be from the Zodiac, appeared to claim responsibility for the disappearance of Donna Lass. Made from a collage of advertisements and magazine lettering, it featured a scene from an advertisement for Forest Pines condominiums and the text "Sierra Club", "Sought Victim 12", "peek through the pines", "pass Lake Tahoe areas", and "around in the snow". The Zodiac's crossed-circle symbol was in both the place of the usual return address and the lower-right section of the front face of the postcard.

Lass was as a registered nurse at the first aid station at the Sahara Tahoe hotel and casino. She worked until about 2:00 a.m. on September 6, 1970, treating her last patient at 1:40 a.m. and her last logbook entry was timed at 1:50 a.m. Later that same day, both Lass's employer and her landlord received phone calls from an unknown male falsely claiming that Lass had left town because of a family emergency.  Lass did not have a family emergency at the time. Lass was never found and the caller has never been identified. Her car was found parked near her apartment in Stateline, Nevada, but nobody saw her leave the casino. All of her personal belongings were left behind at her home, except her purse and the clothes she was wearing the night she vanished. 

What appeared to be a gravesite was discovered near the Clair Tappaan Lodge in Norden, California, on Sierra Club property. 
On December 27, 1974, a Christmas card was mailed to Mary Pilker, Lass' sister, portraying trees covered in snow. Once opened it revealed a message that was part of the card itself - 'Holiday Greetings and Best Wishes for a Happy New Year', followed by the handwriting "Best Wishes, St. Donna & Guardian of the Pines". The envelope was addressed to 'Mrs. Mary Pilker, 1609 South Grange, Sioux Falls, South Dakota'. It was postmarked 940, either from San Mateo or Santa Clara County. Donna was listed as a survivor in the 1973 obituary of her father; but, she was listed as deceased in the 1982 obituary of her mother. No evidence has been uncovered to definitively connect the Lass disappearance with the Zodiac Killer.

Further Zodiac communications 

Zodiac continued to communicate with authorities for the remainder of 1970 via letters and greeting cards to the press. In a letter postmarked April 20, 1970, the Zodiac wrote, "My name is _," followed by a 13-character cipher that has not been solved to this day. The Zodiac went on to state that he was not responsible for the recent bombing of a police station in San Francisco (referring to the February 18, 1970, death of Sgt. Brian McDonnell two days after the bombing at Park Station in Golden Gate Park) but added "there is more glory to killing a cop than a cid  because a cop can shoot back." The letter included a diagram of a bomb the Zodiac claimed that he would use to blow up a school bus. At the bottom of the diagram, he wrote: " = 10, SFPD = 0."

Zodiac sent a greeting card postmarked April 28, 1970 to the Chronicle. Written on the card was "I hope you enjoy yourselves when I have my BLAST," followed by the Zodiac's cross-circle signature. On the back of the card, the Zodiac threatened to use the bus bomb soon unless the newspaper published the full details that he had written. He also wanted to start seeing people wearing "some nice Zodiac butons ".

In a letter postmarked June 26, 1970, the Zodiac stated that he was upset that he did not see people wearing Zodiac buttons. He wrote, "I shot a man sitting in a parked car with a .38." The Zodiac was possibly referring to the murder of 25-year-old Sgt. Richard Radetich one week earlier. At 5:25 a.m. on June 19, Radetich was writing a parking ticket in his squad car when an assailant unrelated to the traffic violation shot him in the head with a .38-caliber pistol through the closed driver's side window. Radetich died 15 hours later. The San Francisco Police Department (SFPD) denies that the Zodiac was involved; the murder remains unsolved.

Included with the letter was a Phillips 66 roadmap of the San Francisco Bay area. On the image of Mount Diablo, the Zodiac had drawn a crossed circle similar to those from previous correspondence. At the top of the crossed circle, he placed a zero, a three, six, and a nine. The accompanying instructions stated that the zero was "to be set to Mag. N." The letter also included a 32-letter cipher that the killer claimed would, in conjunction with the code, lead to the location of a bomb that he had buried and set to detonate in the fall. The cipher was never decoded, and the alleged bomb was never located. The killer signed the note with " - 12, SFPD - 0".

In a letter to the Chronicle postmarked July 24, 1970, the Zodiac took credit for Kathleen Johns's abduction, four months after the incident. In a July 26, 1970 letter, the Zodiac paraphrased a song from The Mikado, adding his own lyrics about making a "little list" of the ways in which he planned to torture his "slaves" in "paradice". The letter was signed with a large, exaggerated crossed-circle symbol and a new score: " = 13, SFPD = 0". A final note at the bottom of the letter stated, "P.S. The Mt. Diablo code concerns Radians + # inches along the radians." In 1981, a close examination of the radian hint by Zodiac researcher Gareth Penn led to the discovery that a radian angle, when placed over the map per Zodiac's instructions, pointed to the locations of two Zodiac attacks.

The card's message was formed by pasting words and letters from an edition of the Chronicle, and thirteen holes were punched across the card. Inspectors Armstrong and Toschi agreed that it was "highly probable" that the card had been sent by the Zodiac.

Letter to Paul Avery

On October 27, 1970, Chronicle reporter Paul Avery (who had been covering the Zodiac case) received a Halloween card signed with a letter 'Z' and the Zodiac's crossed-circle symbol. Handwritten inside the card was the note "Peek-a-boo, you are doomed." The threat was taken seriously and was the subject of a front-page story in the Chronicle. Avery reported his findings in the Chronicle on November 16, 1970.

Final Zodiac letter
After the Lake Tahoe card, the Zodiac remained silent for nearly three years. The Chronicle then received a letter from the Zodiac, postmarked January 29, 1974, praising The Exorcist as "the best saterical comidy  that I have ever seen". The letter included a snippet of verse from The Mikado and an unusual symbol at the bottom that has remained unexplained by researchers. Zodiac concluded the letter with a new score, "Me = 37, SFPD = 0".

Later letters of suspicious authorship
Of further communications sent by the public to members of the news media, some contained similar characteristics of previous Zodiac writings. The Chronicle received a letter postmarked February 14, 1974, informing the editor that the initials for the Symbionese Liberation Army spelled out an Old Norse word meaning "kill". However, the handwriting was not authenticated as the Zodiac's.

A letter to the Chronicle, postmarked May 8, 1974 featured a complaint that the movie Badlands was "murder-glorification" and asked the paper to cut its advertisements. Signed only "A citizen", the handwriting, tone, and surface irony were all similar to earlier Zodiac communications. The Chronicle subsequently received an anonymous letter postmarked July 8, 1974, complaining of their publishing the writings of the antifeminist columnist Marco Spinelli. The letter was signed "the Red Phantom (red with rage)". The Zodiac's authorship of this letter is debated.

A letter, dated April 24, 1978, was initially deemed authentic but was declared a hoax less than three months later by three experts. Dave Toschi, the SFPD homicide detective who had worked the case since the Stine murder, was thought to have forged the letter. Author Armistead Maupin believed the letter to be similar to "fan mail" that praised the work of Toschi in the investigation, which he received in 1976; he believed both letters were written by Toschi. While he admitted to writing the fan mail, Toschi denied forging the Zodiac letter and was eventually cleared of any charges. The authenticity of this letter remains unverified.

On March 3, 2007, an American Greetings Christmas card sent to the Chronicle, postmarked 1990 in Eureka, was re-discovered in their photo files by editorial assistant Daniel King. This letter was handed over to the Vallejo police. Inside the envelope, with the card, was a photocopy of two U.S. Postal keys on a magnet keychain. The handwriting on the envelope resembles Zodiac's print but was declared inauthentic by forensic document examiner Lloyd Cunningham; however, not all Zodiac experts agree with Cunningham's analysis. There is no return address on the envelope nor is his crossed-circle signature to be found. The card itself is unmarked. The Chronicle turned over all the material to the Vallejo Police Department for further analysis.

21st-century developments
In April 2004, the SFPD marked the case "inactive", citing caseload pressure and resource demands, effectively closing the case. However, they re-opened their case sometime before March 2007. The case is open in Napa County and in the city of Riverside.

In May 2018, the Vallejo Police Department announced their intention to attempt to collect the Zodiac Killer's DNA from the back of stamps he used during his correspondence. The analysis, by a private laboratory, was expected to check the DNA against GEDmatch. It was hoped the Zodiac Killer may be caught in a similar fashion to the "Golden State Killer" Joseph James DeAngelo. In May 2018, a Vallejo police detective said that results were expected in several weeks. However, as of October 2022, no results have been reported.

Suspects

Arthur Leigh Allen 
Robert Graysmith's book Zodiac advanced Arthur Leigh Allen, who died in 1992, as a potential suspect based on circumstantial evidence. Allen had been interviewed by police from the early days of the Zodiac investigations and was the subject of several search warrants over a 20-year period. In 2007, Graysmith noted that several police detectives described Allen as the most likely suspect. In 2010, Dave Toschi stated that all the evidence against Allen ultimately "turned out to be negative". Toschi's daughter said in 2018 that her father had always thought Allen had been the killer, but they did not have the evidence to prove it. Mark Ruffalo, who portrayed Toschi in the 2007 film Zodiac, commented, "If you get into who these cops were, you realize how they have to take their hunches, their personal beliefs, out of it. Dave Toschi said to me, 'As soon as that guy walked in the door, I knew it was him.' He was sure he had him, but he never had a solid piece of evidence. So he had to keep investigating every other lead."

On October 6, 1969, Allen was interviewed by Detective John Lynch of the Vallejo Police Department. Allen had been reported in the vicinity of the Lake Berryessa attack against Hartnell and Shepard on September 27, 1969; he described himself scuba diving at Salt Point on the day of the attacks. Allen again came to police attention in 1971 when his friend Donald Cheney reported to police in Manhattan Beach, California, that Allen had spoken of his desire to kill people, used the name Zodiac, and secured a flashlight to a firearm for visibility at night. According to Cheney, this conversation occurred no later than January 1, 1969.

Jack Mulanax of the Vallejo Police Department subsequently wrote that Allen had received a dishonorable discharge from the U.S. Navy in 1958 and had been fired from his job as an elementary school teacher in March 1968 after allegations of sexual misconduct with students. He was generally well-regarded by those who knew him, but he was also described as "fixated on young children and angry at women".

Allen was interviewed by the police in 1971. Zodiac wouldn't write again until 1974.

In September 1972, San Francisco police obtained a search warrant for Allen's residence. In 1974, Allen was arrested for sexually assaulting a 12-year-old boy; he pleaded guilty and served two years imprisonment.

Vallejo police served another search warrant at Allen's residence in February 1991. Two days after Allen's death in 1992, Vallejo police served another warrant and seized property from his residence. In July 1992, victim Mike Mageau identified Allen as the man who shot him in 1969 from a photo line-up, saying "That's him! It's the man who shot me!" However, police officer Donald Fouke, who is speculated to have seen the Zodiac fleeing from the Stine killing, said in the 2007 documentary His Name Was Arthur Leigh Allen that Allen weighed about 100 pounds more than the man he saw, adding that his face was "too round". Nancy Slover, who received the call from the Zodiac in the aftermath of the Mageau/Ferrin shooting, said that Allen did not sound like the man on the phone.

Other evidence existed against Allen, albeit entirely circumstantial. A letter sent to the Riverside Police Department from Bates's killer was typed with a Royal typewriter with an Elite type, the same brand found during the February 1991 search of Allen's residence. He owned and wore a Zodiac brand wristwatch. He lived in Vallejo and worked minutes away from where one of the Zodiac victims (Ferrin) lived and from where one of the killings took place.

In 2002, the SFPD developed a partial DNA profile from the saliva on stamps and envelopes of Zodiac's letters. The SFPD compared this partial DNA to that of Arthur Leigh Allen. A DNA comparison was also made with the DNA of Don Cheney, who was Allen's former close friend and the first person to suggest Allen may be the Zodiac Killer. Since neither test result indicated a match, Allen and Cheney were excluded as the contributors of the DNA.

Retired police handwriting expert Lloyd Cunningham, who worked on the Zodiac case for decades, stated, "They gave me banana boxes full of Allen's writing, and none of his writing even came close to the Zodiac. Nor did DNA extracted from the envelopes (on the Zodiac letters) come close to Arthur Leigh Allen."

Gary Francis Poste 
In October 2021, the Case Breakers, claiming to be a team of over 40 cold case investigators composed of former law enforcement investigators, military intelligence officers, and journalists, claimed to have identified the Zodiac Killer as Gary Francis Poste, who died in 2018 at the age of 80. The team claimed to have uncovered forensic evidence and photos from Poste's darkroom, and noted that scars on Poste's forehead matched those they said were described on the killer. They also claimed that removing the letters of Poste's name from one of Zodiac's cryptograms revealed an alternate message.

The FBI subsequently stated that the case remained open and that there is "no new information to report," while local law enforcement expressed skepticism to the Chronicle regarding the team's findings. Riverside police officer Ryan Railsback said the Case Breakers' claims largely relied on circumstantial evidence, and author Tom Voigt, a Zodiac Killer investigator, called the claims "bullshit". Voigt noted that no witnesses in the case described Zodiac as having scars on his forehead.

Other suspects 
In 2018, an independent inquiry by Italian journalist Francesco Amicone implicated Joseph aka Giuseppe Bevilacqua, former superintendent of the Florence American Cemetery and Memorial, as a suspect in both the Zodiac and Monster of Florence murder cases. Bevilacqua testified at the trial of Monster of Florence prime suspect Pietro Pacciani in 1994. Amicone alleged that on September 11, 2017 Bevilacqua confessed to being the killer in both cases. Investigations by Italian authorities into Bevilacqua were suspended in 2021.
 In 2009, an episode of the History Channel television series MysteryQuest investigated newspaper editor Richard Gaikowski. During the time of the murders, Gaikowski worked for Good Times, a San Francisco counterculture newspaper. His appearance resembled the composite sketch, and Nancy Slover, the Vallejo police dispatcher who was contacted by the Zodiac shortly after the Blue Rock Springs Attack, identified a recording of Gaikowski's voice as being the same as the Zodiac's.
 Retired police detective Steve Hodel argues in his book The Black Dahlia Avenger that his father, George Hodel, was the 1947 Black Dahlia killer, whose victims include Elizabeth Short. The book led to the release of previously suppressed files and wire recordings by the Los Angeles district attorney's office of his father, which showed that the elder Hodel had indeed been a prime suspect in Short's murder. District Attorney Steve Kaye subsequently wrote a letter which is published in the revised edition stating that if George Hodel were still alive he would be prosecuted for the crimes. In a follow-up book, Hodel argued a circumstantial case that his father was also the Zodiac Killer based upon a police sketch, the similarity of the style of the Zodiac letters to the Black Dahlia Avenger letters and questioned document examination.
 Lawrence Kaye, later Lawrence Kane: Kathleen Johns, who claimed to have been abducted by the Zodiac Killer, picked out Kane in a photo lineup. Patrol officer Don Fouke, who possibly observed the Zodiac Killer following the murder of Paul Stine, said that Kane closely resembled the man he and Eric Zelms encountered. Kane worked at the same Nevada hotel as possible Zodiac victim Donna Lass. Kane was diagnosed with impulse-control disorder after suffering brain injuries in a 1962 accident. He was arrested for voyeurism and prowling. Fayçal Ziraoui, a French-Moroccan business consultant, claimed in 2021 that he solved the Z13 cipher and the solution to the puzzle reads "My name is Kayr", which he said is a likely typo for Kaye. Others disputed that Ziraoui could have solved the cipher.
 Police informants accused Richard Marshall of being the Zodiac Killer, claiming that he privately hinted at being a murderer. Marshall lived in Riverside in 1966 and San Francisco in 1969, close to the scenes of the Bates and Stine murders. He was a silent film enthusiast and projectionist, screening Segundo de Chomón's The Red Phantom (1907), a name used by the author of a possible 1974 Zodiac letter. Detective Ken Narlow said that "Marshall makes good reading but [is] not a very good suspect in my estimation."
 In February 2014, it was reported that Louis Joseph Myers had confessed to a friend in 2001 that he was the Zodiac Killer after learning that he was dying from cirrhosis of the liver. He requested that his friend, Randy Kenney, go to the police upon his death. Myers died in 2002, but Kenney allegedly had difficulties getting officers to cooperate and take the claims seriously. There are several potential connections between Myers and the Zodiac case; Myers attended the same high schools as victims David Farraday and Betty Lou Jensen, and allegedly worked in the same restaurant as victim Darlene Ferrin. During the 1971–1973 period, when no Zodiac letters were received, Myers was stationed overseas with the military. Kenney says that Myers confessed he targeted couples because he had had a bad breakup with a girlfriend. While officers associated with the case are skeptical, they believe the story is credible enough to investigate if Kenney could produce credible evidence.
 Robert Ivan Nichols, also known as Joseph Newton Chandler III, was a formerly unidentified identity thief who committed suicide in Eastlake, Ohio, in July 2002. After his death, investigators were unable to locate his family and discovered that he had stolen the identity of an eight-year-old boy who was killed in a car crash in Texas in 1945. The lengths to which Nichols went to hide his identity led to speculation that he was a violent fugitive. The U.S. Marshals Service announced his identification at a press conference in Cleveland on June 21, 2018. Some Internet sleuths suggested that he might have been the Zodiac Killer, as he resembled police sketches of the Zodiac and had lived in California, where the Zodiac operated.
 Ross Sullivan became a person of interest through the possible link between the Zodiac Killer and the murder of Cheri Jo Bates in Riverside. Sullivan was a library assistant at Riverside City College and was suspected by coworkers who said that he went missing for several days after the murder. Sullivan resembled sketches of the Zodiac and wore military-style boots with footprints like those found at the Lake Berryessa crime scene. Sullivan was hospitalized multiple times for bipolar disorder and schizophrenia.
 In 2007, Dennis Kaufman claimed that his stepfather Jack Tarrance was the Zodiac. Kaufman turned several items over to the FBI, including a hood similar to the one worn by the Zodiac. According to news sources, DNA analysis conducted by the FBI on the items was deemed inconclusive in 2010.
 Former California Highway Patrol officer Lyndon Lafferty said the Zodiac Killer was a 91-year-old Solano County, California, man he referred to by the pseudonym George Russell Tucker. Using a group of retired law enforcement officers called the Mandamus Seven, Lafferty discovered Tucker and outlined an alleged cover-up for why he was not pursued. Tucker died in February 2012 and was not named because he was not considered a suspect by police.
 In 2014, Gary Stewart published a book, The Most Dangerous Animal of All, in which he claimed his search for his biological father, Earl Van Best Jr., led him to conclude Van Best was the Zodiac Killer. In 2020, the book was adapted for FX Network as a documentary series.

Unnamed suspects 
 In his 1976 autobiography My Life On Trial, Melvin Belli described an engineered encounter with himself, undercover police officers, and an unnamed Riverside law student who had allegedly threatened a female classmate by claiming to be the Zodiac. Upon meeting the young man face-to-face and confronting him, Belli decided that he was not the Zodiac and subsequent handwriting analyses remained inconclusive. Authorities ruled this person out as a suspect.
 In 2009, former lawyer Robert Tarbox, who was disbarred in August 1975 by the California Supreme Court for failure to pay some clients, said that in the early 1970s a merchant mariner walked into his office and confessed to him that he was the Zodiac Killer. The seemingly lucid seaman, whose name Tarbox would not reveal based on confidentiality, described his crimes briefly but persuasively enough to convince Tarbox. The man said he was trying to stop himself from his "opportunistic" murder spree but never returned to see Tarbox again. Tarbox took out a full-page ad in the Vallejo Times-Herald that he claimed would clear the name of Arthur Leigh Allen as a killer, his only reason for revealing the story 30 years after the fact. Robert Graysmith, the author of several books on Zodiac, said Tarbox's story was "entirely plausible".
 In 2010, a picture surfaced of known Zodiac victim Darlene Ferrin and an unknown man who closely resembles the composite sketch, formed based on eyewitnesses' descriptions, of the Zodiac Killer. According to America's Most Wanted (February 19, 2011), police believe the photo was taken in San Francisco in the middle of either 1966 or 1967.
 Sandy Betts is an amateur Zodiac researcher who claims that the people responsible for the Zodiac attacks repeatedly harassed and attacked her. She states that three men were the primary culprits and that at least one of these core members is identified and still lives in the San Francisco Bay Area. Betts also claims that the primary killer was known as "Tony" and worked in construction. She estimates several dozen fatal Zodiac attacks overall. In her narrative, some elements of Zodiac crimes are theatrical in nature.

Cleared suspects 
 According to researcher Tom Voigt, fingerprint comparison in February 1989 eliminated 1970s serial killer Ted Bundy as a person of interest in the Zodiac case.
 Serial killer Edward Edwards, who committed five murders between 1977 and 1996, was linked to the Zodiac murders and several other unsolved cases by former cold case detective John A. Cameron. Cameron tied Edwards to the West Memphis Three, the Atlanta Child Murders, the 2001 Amerithrax attacks, the killing of Chandra Levy and the murder of Kent Heitholt. He also documented similarities between the murder of JonBenét Ramsey and the Zodiac's known crimes. The fake "ransom note" contained Zodiac-like misspellings and references to crime films. One of these films was Dirty Harry, which the Zodiac referenced in his correspondence. Cameron also wrote that JonBenét told a neighbour that she would meet "Santa Clause" on the night that she was later killed. The Zodiac wore an elaborate costume at Lake Berryessa and claimed to use disguises when he committed his crimes. However, his theories were met with "almost universal disdain, especially from law enforcement".
 Ted Kaczynski, a domestic terrorist and mathematician also known as the Unabomber, was investigated for possible connections to the Zodiac Killer in 1996. Kaczynski worked in northern California at the time of the Zodiac murders and, like the Zodiac, had an interest in cryptography and threatened the press into publishing his communications. Kaczynski was ruled out by both the FBI and SFPD based on fingerprint and handwriting comparison, and by his absence from California on certain dates of known Zodiac activity.
 The Manson Family: following the capture of Charles Manson and his murderous cult, a 1970 report by the California Bureau of Criminal Identification and Investigation stated that all male members of the Manson Family had been investigated and eliminated as Zodiac suspects.

Letters and ciphers gallery

See also 
 List of serial killers in the United States
 List of fugitives from justice who disappeared
 Texarkana Moonlight Murders

Notes

References

Citations

Works cited

Further reading

Literature

 
 
 
 
 Ronald J. Dayton (2018), Zodiac 340 Cipher, Inner Rapport Publishing 
 Michael H. Stone, M.D. & Gary Brucato, Ph.D., The New Evil: Understanding the Emergence of Modern Violent Crime. Amherst, NY: Prometheus Books, pp. 113–128.

FBI files

 FBI Case File (1 of 5) on the Zodiac Killer. 89 pages.
 FBI Case File (2 of 5) on the Zodiac Killer. 109 pages.
 FBI Case File (3 of 5) on the Zodiac Killer. 258 pages.
 FBI Case File (4 of 5) on the Zodiac Killer. 208 pages.
 FBI Case File (5 of 5) on the Zodiac Killer. 373 pages.

External links
 
 
 "Zodiac Murder Map" – Google Map plotting definite and possible Zodiac attacks (with details).
 Detailed account of the Zodiac case

 
1968 murders in the United States
1969 murders in the United States
1960s in the United States
1970s in the United States
20th-century criminals
American cryptographers
American murderers of children
American robbers
American serial killers
Criminals of the San Francisco Bay Area
History of Napa County, California
Male serial killers
Modern cryptographers
Murder in Riverside County, California
Murder in the San Francisco Bay Area
Nicknames
Nicknames in crime
Possibly living people
Undeciphered historical codes and ciphers
Unidentified American serial killers
Unsolved murders in the United States
Vallejo, California